Hugo Benedict Schwyzer (born May 22, 1967) is an American author, speaker and former instructor of history and gender studies.

Family background
Hugo Schwyzer was born in Santa Barbara, California, to Hubert (1935–2006) and Alison Schwyzer, both of whom were professors of philosophy: Hubert taught at the University of California, Santa Barbara; Alison at Monterey Peninsula College. His younger brother, Philip, also pursued an academic career, becoming professor of renaissance literature at the University of Exeter, England.

Schwyzer's parents divorced when he was young. He and his brother were then raised by his mother in Carmel, California. Schwyzer maintained a connection to his father, who was taken to England as a child when his parents fled Austria after the Anschluss, and later emigrated to California. Schwyzer's paternal grandfather, Georg, was a Vienna-based Jewish physician while his paternal grandmother, Elsa, was half-Jewish.

Academic career
Schwyzer studied history at University of California, Berkeley, specializing in medieval history. He developed a passion for this subject after seeing Derek Jacobi perform Shakespeare's Richard II. He attended graduate school at UCLA and was awarded his PhD in 1999.

His doctoral dissertation was entitled "Arms and the Bishop: The Anglo-Scottish War and the Northern Episcopate, 1296–1357", and dealt with the military role of the Bishops of Durham and the Archbishops of York during the Wars of Scottish Independence. He published a related book chapter, "Northern bishops and the Anglo-Scottish War in the reign of Edward II", in Thirteenth Century England 7 (1999).

His three areas of study at graduate level were:
Medieval English philosophy – William of Ockham & Duns Scotus
Early Irish monasticism, and the Collectio canonum Hibernensis
 Early modern economic development, especially proto-industrialization

Schwyzer joined the Pasadena City College faculty first as an adjunct instructor in 1993 then in a tenure-track position in 1994.  Over the following two decades he taught various history and gender studies courses at PCC, as well as co-taught an interdisciplinary humanities course alongside English and psychology faculty members. He was forced to resign in October 2013 due to personal issues and public controversies.

In February 2013, Schwyzer invited adult film actor James Deen to return to Deen's alma mater, Pasadena City College, to speak to students about his career. The appearance, initially open to the public, was restricted by college administrators due to "public safety concerns" over "protesters". Deen was restricted to speaking to the students of Pasadena City College's "Navigating Pornography" class.

Other activities
Schwyzer wrote on public and personal topics for publications including Jezebel and The Atlantic, was a contributor to The Good Men Project, and co-authored supermodel Carré Otis autobiography Beauty, Disrupted: A Memoir, published in 2011 by HarperCollins.

Schwyzer describes himself as a former teen sex worker, recounting in a 2021 Substack post that he had sex with many dozens of older men for money between ages 17 and 19.

Controversies
Schwyzer became the subject of controversy when he disclosed to school administration and the general public his many affairs with his young female college students. In several blog posts and interviews, Schwyzer further admitted to an ongoing problem with alcohol and drug abuse, a decades-long struggle with borderline personality disorder and bipolar depression, and a violent murder-suicide attempt with his ex-girlfriend while both were under the influence of narcotics in the summer of 1998. 

On August 9, 2013, Schwyzer tweeted a rapid-fire series of confessions described as a "meltdown"; his tweet storm included confessions of sex with porn stars who had spoken in his classes, as well as his own absence of credentials to teach women's studies. When white feminists expressed concern for Schwyzer's mental health, black activist Mikki Kendall created the hashtag #solidarityisforwhitewomen, which rapidly trended worldwide.  In an op-ed for The Guardian, Kendall noted that "Hugo Schwyzer's Twitter confession was the catalyst" for the hashtag's creation and subsequent popularity.

In September 2013, the college announced that it was launching an investigation of Schwyzer that could lead to his termination. In the media, Schwyzer indicated that he would resign and leave quietly if the college allowed him to remain on salary until the end of the year, at which time health benefits and disability retirement would have commenced.  The college denied this request.  On October 8, 2013, Schwyzer resigned and the college investigation closed.

A week earlier, writing under the heading "Picking up a felony DUI", Schwyzer announced that he had been involved in a car crash, causing injury to a 25-year-old woman. The incident occurred on Friday, September 27, 2013, near San Juan Bautista, California. Schwyzer apologized to the injured woman before she was airlifted to hospital, made a full confession to law enforcement, and also stated "I am a danger to myself and others and mitigating that danger is vital." He was then charged with felony DUI and released from San Benito County Jail on bail of $100,000. A court date of November 5, 2013, was given. Schwyzer was reported to be in "an extended treatment program in Malibu, California, focusing on mental illness and chemical dependency." In an April 2015 blog comment, Schwyzer claimed that the DUI matter had been resolved, but that he had been asked not to comment on the matter further.

Current status
In January 2014, Schwyzer began working as a tax accounting assistant in Los Angeles. In March 2015, in the final entry on his blog, Schwyzer noted that he was not "coming back" nor planning any "grand return" to public life.

As of October 2018, Schwyzer was reported to be working at a Trader Joe's.

In October 2020, Schwyzer returned to writing with a subscription-based Substack newsletter.

Personal life
Schwyzer has been divorced four times. He has two children.

References

External links

1967 births
21st-century American non-fiction writers
Pasadena City College faculty
American bloggers
American educators
American political writers
American male non-fiction writers
American bisexual writers
Feminism in the United States
American feminist writers
Living people
Male feminists
Writers from Santa Barbara, California
American people of Austrian descent
American people of Austrian-Jewish descent
People with bipolar disorder
People with borderline personality disorder
People from Carmel-by-the-Sea, California
American male bloggers
University of California, Berkeley alumni
University of California, Los Angeles alumni